Agency Township may refer to:
 Agency Township, Wapello County, Iowa
 Agency Township, Osage County, Kansas
 Agency Township, Buchanan County, Missouri
 Agency Township, Roberts County, South Dakota